Apocrine gland carcinoma is a cutaneous condition characterized by skin lesions which form in the axilla or anogenital regions.

See also 
 Eccrine carcinoma
 Primary cutaneous adenoid cystic carcinoma
 Skin lesion

References 

Epidermal nevi, neoplasms, and cysts
Apocrine